Scrobipalpa skulei is a moth in the family Gelechiidae. It was described by Peter Huemer and Ole Karsholt in 2010. It is found in Slovenia.

Etymology
The species is named from Bjarne E. Skule who collected valuable material of Gelechiidae during the last decades.

References

Scrobipalpa
Moths described in 2010